The 1969 Tasmanian state election was held on 10 May 1969  in the Australian state of Tasmania to elect 35 members of the Tasmanian House of Assembly. The election used the Hare-Clark proportional representation system — seven members were elected from each of five electorates.

The incumbent Labor Party, which had been in power continuously since 1934, was led by Eric Reece, who had been premier of Tasmania since 1958. The opposition Liberal Party was led by Angus Bethune.

The election resulted in a hung parliament, with the Labor and Liberal parties on 17 seats each (out of 35). The balance of power was held by Kevin Lyons, a former Liberal who had quit the party in 1966 after a dispute over preselection and formed the Centre Party. Lyons approached Bethune with an offer for a coalition government with himself as Deputy Premier.  Bethune agreed, allowing him to form government by one seat—thus consigning Labor to opposition for the first time in 35 years.

Results

|}

  The Centre Party was composed out of the former Country Party in Tasmania, and was supported by federal Country MHRs.

Distribution of votes

Primary vote by division

Distribution of seats

Aftermath
The Liberal-Centre coalition lasted for one term, with Lyons dissolving the partnership in 1972. The resulting instability triggered an election, which was easily won by Eric Reece and the Labor Party.

See also
 Members of the Tasmanian House of Assembly, 1969–1972
 Candidates of the 1969 Tasmanian state election

References

Elections in Tasmania
1969 elections in Australia
1960s in Tasmania
May 1969 events in Australia